Jaka Klobučar (born August 19, 1987) is a Slovenian professional basketball player for Kecskemét of the Nemzeti Bajnokság. He also represented the Slovenian national basketball team.

Professional career
Klobučar has played with Krka Novo Mesto, Geoplin Slovan, Partizan Belgrade, Union Olimpija, Ostuni Basket and ratiopharm ulm.

On 4 September 2015, he signed for İstanbul BB, where he spent three seasons. On August 7, 2018, he signed with Galatasaray of the Turkish Basketbol Süper Ligi (BSL).

On November 3, 2019, he signed with Élan Chalon of the French LNB Pro A. 

On January 20, 2021, he moved back to Turkey for Büyükçekmece Basketbol.

On November 9, 2021, Klobučar signed with Aris of the Greek Basket League, temporarily replacing the injured Olivier Hanlan on the team's roster. On December 10 of the same year, he officially parted ways with the Greek club, having appeared in two league matches and averaging 7.5 points and 3 assists per contest.

National team career
Klobučar competed for the senior Slovenian national basketball team at the 2007 FIBA European Championship,  Olympic Qualifying Tournament 2008, 2009 FIBA European Championship, and 2010 FIBA World Championship.

He represented Slovenia at the 2015 EuroBasket where they were eliminated by Latvia in eighth finals.

Career statistics

EuroLeague

|-
| style="text-align:left;"| 2008–09
| style="text-align:left;" rowspan=2| Union Olimpija
| 9 || 4 || 16.1 || .237 || .125 || .667 || 2.2 || .9 || .4 || .0 || 3.8 || 1.8
|-
| style="text-align:left;"| 2009–10
| 9 || 4 || 11.1 || .350 || .417 || .333 || .9 || .6 || .8 || .0 || 2.3 || .6
|-
| style="text-align:left;"| 2010–11
| style="text-align:left;"| Partizan
| 16 || 2 || 10.4 || .313 || .194 || .625 || .8 || .7 || .4 || .0 || 2.8 || .6
|- class="sortbottom"
| style="text-align:left;"| Career
| style="text-align:left;"|
| 34 || 10 || 12.5 || .292 || .220 || .605 || 1.2 || .7 || .5 || .0 || 3.0 || 1.0

References

External links
 Jaka Klobučar at aba-liga.com
 Jaka Klobučar at euroleague.net
 Jaka Klobučar at tblstat.net
 

1987 births
Living people
2010 FIBA World Championship players
2014 FIBA Basketball World Cup players
ABA League players
Aris B.C. players
Élan Chalon players
Galatasaray S.K. (men's basketball) players
İstanbul Büyükşehir Belediyespor basketball players
KD Slovan players
KK Krka players
KK Olimpija players
KK Partizan players
Point guards
Ratiopharm Ulm players
Shooting guards
Slovenian expatriate basketball people in Serbia
Slovenian expatriate basketball people in Germany
Slovenian expatriate basketball people in Greece
Slovenian expatriate basketball people in Italy
Slovenian expatriate basketball people in Turkey
Slovenian men's basketball players
Sportspeople from Novo Mesto